Earthworks are engineering works created through the processing of parts of the earth's surface involving quantities of soil or unformed rock.

Shoring structures
An incomplete list of possible temporary or permanent geotechnical shoring structures that may be designed and utilised as part of earthworks:

Mechanically stabilized earth
Earth anchor
Cliff stabilization
Grout curtain
Retaining wall
Slurry wall
Soil nailing
Tieback (geotechnical)
Trench shoring
Caisson
Dam
Gabion
Ground freezing

Gallery

Excavation

Excavation may be classified by type of material:
 Topsoil excavation
 Earth excavation
 Rock excavation
 Muck excavation – this usually contains excess water and unsuitable soil
 Unclassified excavation – this is any combination of material types
Excavation may be classified by the purpose:

 Stripping
 Roadway excavation
 Drainage or structure excavation
 Bridge excavation
 Channel excavation
 Footing excavation
 Borrow excavation
 Dredge excavation
 Underground excavation

Civil engineering use
Typical earthworks include road construction, railway beds, causeways, dams, levees, canals, and berms. Other common earthworks are land grading to reconfigure the topography of a site, or to stabilize slopes.

Military use

In military engineering, earthworks are, more specifically, types of fortifications constructed from soil. Although soil is not very strong, it is cheap enough that huge quantities can be used, generating formidable structures. Examples of older earthwork fortifications include  moats, sod walls, motte-and-bailey castles, and hill forts. Modern examples include trenches and berms.

Equipment
Heavy construction equipment is usually used due to the amounts of material to be moved — up to millions of cubic metres. Earthwork construction was revolutionized by the development of the (Fresno) scraper and other earth-moving machines such as the loader, the dump truck, the grader, the bulldozer, the backhoe, and the dragline excavator.

Mass haul planning

Engineers need to concern themselves with issues of geotechnical engineering (such as soil density and strength) and with quantity estimation to ensure that soil volumes in the cuts match those of the fills, while minimizing the distance of movement. In the past, these calculations were done by hand using a slide rule and with methods such as Simpson's rule. Earthworks cost is a function of hauled amount x hauled distance. The goal of mass haul planning is to determine these amounts and the goal of mass haul optimization is to minimize either or both.

Now they can be performed with a computer and specialized software, including optimisation on haul cost and not haul distance (as haul cost is not proportional to haul distance).

See also

, construction/engineering vehicles used for earthworks civil engineering

Calculation software

The table below provides a list of  software used in the engineering and construction industries to plan, execute and cost these earthworks. 

Earthwork software is generally a subset of CAD software, in which case it often an add-on to a more general CAD package such as AutoCAD. In that case, earthwork software is principally used to calculate cut and fill volumes which are then used for producing material and time estimates. Most products offer additional functionality such as the ability to takeoff terrain elevation from plans (using contour lines and spot heights); produce shaded cut and fill maps; produce cross sections and visualize terrain in 3D. The means by which volumes are calculated in software can differ quite considerably leading to potentially different results with the same input data.  Many software products use methods based on triangulated irregular networks (TINS) and triangular prism volume algorithms, however other calculation methods are in use based on rationalizing elevations into high density grids or cross-sections.

A few programs are specialised in  earthworks transport optimization and  planning the construction works.

References

External links

Finding Volume of Earthwork using Simpson's Rule

 
Fortification (architectural elements)
Civil engineering